The 2000 New York City Marathon was the 31st running of the annual marathon race in New York City, United States, which took place on Sunday, November 5. The men's elite race was won by Morocco's Abdelkader El Mouaziz in a time of 2:10:09 hours while the women's race was won by Russia's Lyudmila Petrova in 2:25:45.

For the first time, disabled athletes were included in the New York Marathon with the introduction of official categories for wheelchairs and handcycles. In the wheelchair races, Tunisia's Kamel Ayari (1:53:50) and Vietnam's Anh Nguyen Thi Xuan (2:46:47) won the men's and women's divisions, respectively. In the handcycle race, Americans Joseph Dowling (1:54:25) and Helene Hines (1:57:27) were the winners.

A total of 29,327 runners finished the race, 21,015 men and 8312 women.

Results

Men

Women

Wheelchair men

Wheelchair women

Handcycle men

Handcycle women

References

Results
2000 New York Marathon Results. New York Road Runners. Retrieved 2020-05-21.
Results. Association of Road Racing Statisticians. Retrieved 2020-05-21.

External links
New York Road Runners website

2000
New York City
Marathon
New York City Marathon